George R. Jones (February 8, 1862 in Lebanon, Maine – February 29, 1936) was a Massachusetts lawyer and politician who served in the Massachusetts House of Representatives, and as a member, and President of, the Massachusetts Senate.

See also
 124th Massachusetts General Court (1903)
 125th Massachusetts General Court (1904)

References

1862 births
1936 deaths
Boston University alumni
Boston University School of Law alumni
Massachusetts lawyers
People from Melrose, Massachusetts
Republican Party members of the Massachusetts House of Representatives
Republican Party Massachusetts state senators
Presidents of the Massachusetts Senate